The Astara–Rasht–Qazvin railway is a transport corridor that connects existing railways of Russia, Azerbaijan and Iran. The project is carried out within the framework of the International North–South Transport Corridor. The purpose of the project is to integrate the transport and information routes of Russia, Azerbaijan, Iran and India.

History 
The agreement on the route's construction was signed by three parties (Iran, Azerbaijan and Russia) in 2005. The most challenging section from an engineering point of view was the construction of the railway between Rasht and Ghazvin which started in 2009  and took nearly a decade to complete. On 22 November 2018, a test train ran for the first time on that 164 km section of the line whose formal opening ceremony was held on 6 March 2019 with the Iranian President Hassan Rouhani, Azerbaijani Minister of Economy Shahin Mustafayev plus officials from Pakistan and Iraq in attendance. The line was a major engineering achievement including some 53 tunnels with a cumulative length of over 22 km.

The bridge and short section of track between Iranian and Azerbaijani Astara, using dual gauges (1520mm and 1435mm) plus a 82.5m river bridge over the Astarachay River, was completed in March 2017.  The first arrival of a train coming all the way from Russia to Iranian Astara was documented on February 8, 2018. Immediately after putting into operation the section Astara (Azerbaijan) - Astara (Iran) in 2018, the Iranian section of the railway together with the Astara station and the newly built cargo terminal was leased to Azerbaijan for a period of 25 years. During the first 11 months of operation, around 270,000 tons of cargo was transported via this railway growing to 364,000 tons in 2019.

As of early 2019, the construction of the 130 km Rasht-Astara leg remained at a 'study and review stage' but with approval granted in Iran as of January  and around half of the estimated cost ($1.1 billion) secured by a preferential loan of $500 million from Azerbaijan. Some press reports claim that track laying should be complete by 2021, depending on the effect of Covid-19, while other sources suggested a more conservative estimate of around 2023 and yet others hinted that as of the ECO meeting of 17 December 2019, no physical construction had yet commenced. In November 2020 the Iranian ambassador to Russia was quoted as calling for a rapid completion of the Astara Rasht line as an economic imperative.

See also 
Baku–Tbilisi–Kars railway
Pipelines in Azerbaijan

References 

Pipeline transport
Railway lines in Azerbaijan
Railway lines in Iran